Darreh Mahi Olya (also Romanized as Darreh Māhī Olyā and  Darreh Māhī-ye ‘Olyā; also known as Darreh Māhī and Darreh Māhī-ye Bālā) is a village in Pishkuh-e Zalaqi Rural District, Besharat District, Aligudarz County, Lorestan Province, Iran. At the 2006 census, its population was 57, in 10 families.

References 

Towns and villages in Aligudarz County